Cusano Mutri is a comune (municipality) in the Province of Benevento in the Italian region Campania, located about 60 km northeast of Naples and about 35 km northwest of Benevento.

The municipality of Cusano Mutri contains the frazioni (subdivisions, mainly villages and hamlets) Civitella Licinio and Bocca della Selva.

Cusano Mutri borders the following municipalities: Cerreto Sannita, Faicchio, Gioia Sannitica, Guardiaregia, Piedimonte Matese, Pietraroja, San Lorenzello, San Potito Sannitico.

References

External links
 Official website

Cities and towns in Campania